Actinopus emas is a species of mygalomorph spider in the family Actinopodidae. It can be found in Brazil.

The specific name emas refers to the Emas National Park.

References 

emas
Spiders described in 2020